The women's marathon event at the 1987 Pan American Games was held in Indianapolis, United States on 9 August. It was the first time that this event was contested at the Games.

Results

References

Marathon
1987
Pan
Panamerican
1987 Panamerican
1987 Panamerican Games